It's Burke's Law (Jamaica Ska Explosion) is an album from 1965 by the Prince Buster All Stars. The album includes "Al Capone", one of Prince Buster's signature songs.

The TV series Burke's Law ran from 1963 to 1965.

Track listing
 "Burke's Law"
 "Al Capone"
 "Gun the Man Down"
 "Skahara"
 "Trip to Mars"
 "Rygin'"
 "Mighty As a Rose"
 "Indian Love Call"
 "Here Comes the Bride"
 "Almost Like Being in Love"
 "Shep on Top"
 "Feel Up"

Personnel
Prince Buster All Stars
Prince Buster - vocals
Jah Jerry Haynes - guitar
Ernest Ranglin - bass guitar
Gladstone Anderson - piano
Arkland "Drumbago" Parks - drums
Dennis "Ska" Campbell, Val Bennett - tenor saxophone
Oswald "Baba" Brooks, Raymond Harper - trumpet
Junior Nelson - trombone

References

1965 albums
Prince Buster albums
Blue Beat Records albums